Structural linguistics, or structuralism, in linguistics, denotes schools or theories in which language is conceived as a self-contained, self-regulating semiotic system whose elements are defined by their relationship to other elements within the system. It is derived from the work of Swiss linguist Ferdinand de Saussure and is part of the overall approach of structuralism. Saussure's Course in General Linguistics, published posthumously in 1916, stressed examining language as a dynamic system of interconnected units. Saussure is also known for introducing several basic dimensions of semiotic analysis that are still important today. Two of these are his key methods of syntagmatic and paradigmatic analysis, which define units syntactically and lexically, respectively, according to their contrast with the other units in the system.

Structuralism as a term, however, was not used by Saussure, who called the approach semiology. The term structuralism is derived from sociologist Émile Durkheim's anti-Darwinian modification of Herbert Spencer's organic analogy which draws a parallel between social structures and the organs of an organism which have different functions or purposes. Similar analogies and metaphors were used in the historical-comparative linguistics that Saussure was part of. Saussure himself made a modification of August Schleicher's language–species analogy, based on William Dwight Whitney's critical writings, to turn focus to the internal elements of the language organism, or system. Nonetheless, structural linguistics became mainly associated with Saussure's notion of language as a dual interactive system of symbols and concepts. The term structuralism was adopted to linguistics after Saussure's death by the Prague school linguists Roman Jakobson and Nikolai Trubetzkoy; while the term structural linguistics was coined by Louis Hjelmslev.

History 
Structural linguistics begins with the posthumous publication of Ferdinand de Saussure's Course in General Linguistics in 1916, which his students compiled from his lectures. The book proved to be highly influential, providing the foundation for both modern linguistics and semiotics. Structuralist linguistics is often thought of as giving rise to independent European and American traditions due to ambiguity in the term. It is most commonly thought that structural linguistics stems from Saussure's writings; but these were rejected by an American school of linguistics based on Wilhelm Wundt's structural psychology.

European structuralism
In Europe, Saussure influenced: (1) the Geneva School of Albert Sechehaye and Charles Bally, (2) the Prague linguistic circle, (3) the Copenhagen School of Louis Hjelmslev, (4) the Paris School of André Martinet and Algirdas Julien Greimas, and the Dutch school of Simon Dik. Structural linguistics also had an influence on other disciplines of humanities bringing about the movement known as structuralism.

'American structuralism', or American descriptivism
Some confusion is caused by the fact that an American school of linguistics of 1910s through 1950s, which was based on structural psychology, (especially Wilhelm Wundt's Völkerpsychologie); and later on behavioural psychology, is sometimes nicknamed 'American structuralism'. This framework was not structuralist in the Saussurean sense that it did not consider language as arising from the interaction of meaning and expression. Instead, it was thought that the civilised human mind is organised into binary branching structures. Advocates of this type of structuralism are identified from their use of 'philosophical grammar' with its convention of placing the object, but not the subject, into the verb phrase; whereby the structure is disconnected from semantics in sharp contrast to Saussurean structuralism. This American school is alternatively called distributionalism, 'American descriptivism', or the 'Bloomfieldian' school – or 'post-Bloomfieldian', following the death of its leader Leonard Bloomfield in 1949. Nevertheless, Wundt's ideas had already been imported from Germany to American humanities by Franz Boas before him, influencing linguists such as Edward Sapir.

Bloomfield named his psychological approach descriptive or philosophical–descriptive; as opposed to the historical–comparative study of languages. Structural linguists like Hjelmslev considered his work fragmentary because it eluded a full account of language. The concept of autonomy is also different: while structural linguists consider semiology (the bilateral sign system) separate from physiology, American descriptivists argued for the autonomy of syntax from semantics. All in all, there were unsolvable incompatibilities between the psychological and positivistic orientation of the Bloomfieldian school, and the semiotic orientation of the structuralists proper. In the generative or Chomskyan concept, a purported rejection of 'structuralism' usually refers to Noam Chomsky's opposition to the behaviourism of Bloomfield's 1933 textbook Language; though, coincidentally, he is also opposed to structuralism proper.

Basic theories and methods 
The foundation of structural linguistics is a sign, which in turn has two components: a "signified" is an idea or concept, while the "signifier" is a means of expressing the signified. The "sign", e.g. a word, is thus the combined association of signifier and signified. The value of a sign can be defined only by being placed in contrast with other signs. This  forms the basis of what later became the paradigmatic dimension of semiotic organization (i.e., terms and inventories of terms that stand in opposition to each other). This is contrasted drastically with the idea that linguistic structures can be examined in isolation from meaning, or that the organisation of the conceptual system can exist without a corresponding organisation of the signifying system.

Paradigmatic relations hold among sets of units, such as the set distinguished phonologically by variation in their initial sound cat, bat, hat, mat, fat, or the morphologically distinguished set ran, run, running. The units of a set must have something in common with one another, but they must contrast too, otherwise they could not be distinguished from each other and would collapse into a single unit, which could not constitute a set on its own, since a set always consists of more than one unit. Syntagmatic relations, in contrast, are concerned with how units, once selected from their paradigmatic sets of oppositions, are 'chained' together into structural wholes.

Syntagmatic and paradigmatic relations provide the structural linguist with a tool for categorization for phonology, morphology and syntax. Take morphology, for example. The signs cat and cats are associated in the mind, producing an abstract paradigm of the word forms of cat. Comparing this with other paradigms of word forms, we can note that, in English, the plural often consists of little more than adding an -s to the end of the word. Likewise, through paradigmatic and syntagmatic analysis, we can discover the syntax of sentences. We thus take syntagmatic evidence (difference in structural configurations) as indicators of paradigmatic relations (e.g., in the present case: questions vs. assertions).

The most detailed account of the relationship between a paradigmatic organisation of language as a motivator and classifier for syntagmatic configurations was provided by Louis Hjelmslev in his Prolegomena to a Theory of Language, giving rise to formal linguistics. Hjelmslev's model was subsequently incorporated into  systemic functional grammar, functional discourse grammar, and Danish functional grammar.

Structural explanation

In structuralism, elements of a language are explained in relation to each other. For example, to understand the function of one grammatical case, it must be contrasted to all the other cases and, more widely, to all other grammatical categories of the language.

The structural approach in humanities follows from 19th century Geist thinking which is derived from Georg Wilhelm Friedrich Hegel's philosophy. According to such theories, society or language arises as the collective psyche of a community; and this psyche is sometimes described as an 'organism'. In sociology, Émile Durkheim made a humanistic modification of Herbert Spencer's organic analogy. Durkheim, following Spencer's theory, compared society to an organism which has structures (organs) that carry out different functions. For Durkheim a structural explanation of society is that the population growth, through an organic solidarity (unlike Spencer who believes it happens by a self-interested conduct) leads to an increase of complexity and diversity in a community, creating a society. The structuralist reference became essential when linguistic 'structuralism' was established by the Prague linguistic circle after Saussure's death, following a shift from structural to functional explanation in the social anthropology of Alfred Radcliffe-Brown and Bronisław Malinowski.

Saussure himself had actually used a modification of August Schleicher's Darwinian organic analogy in linguistics; his concept of la langue is the social organism or spirit. It needs to be noted that, despite certain similarities, structuralism and functionalism in humanistic linguistics are explicitly anti-Darwinian. This means that linguistic structures are not explained in terms of selection through competition; and that the biological metaphor is not to be taken literally. What is more, Saussure abandoned evolutionary linguistics altogether and, instead, defined synchronic analysis as the study of the language system; and diachronic analysis as the study of language change. With such precaution, structural explanation of language is analogous to structuralism in biology which explains structures in relation with material factors or substance. In Saussure's explanation, structure follows from systemic consequences of the association of meaning and expression. This can be contrasted with functional explanation which explains linguistic structure in relation to the "adaptation" of language to the community's communicative needs.

Hjelmslev's elaboration of Saussure's structural explanation is that language arises from the structuring of content and expression. He argues that the nature of language could only be understood via the typological study of linguistic structures. In Hjelmslev's interpretation, there are no physical, psychological or other a priori principles that explain why languages are the way they are. Cross-linguistic similarities on the expression plane depend on a necessity to express meaning; conversely, cross-linguistic similarities on the content plane depend on the necessity to structure meaning potential according to the necessities of expression."The linguist must be equally interested in the similarity and in the difference between languages, two complementary sides of the same thing. The similarity between languages is their very structural principle; the difference between languages is the carrying out of that principle in concreto. Both the similarity and the difference between languages lie, then, in language and in languages themselves, in their internal structure; and no similarity or difference between languages rests on any factor outside language." – Louis Hjelmslev

Compositional and combinatorial language

According to André Martinet's concept of double articulation, language is a double-levelled or doubly articulated system. In this context, 'articulation' means 'joining'. The first level of articulation involves minimally meaningful units (monemes: words or morphemes), while the second level consists of minimally distinct non-signifying units (phonemes). Owing to double articulation, it is possible to construct all necessary words of a language with a couple dozen phonic units. Meaning is associated with combinations of the non-meaningful units. The organisation of language into hierarchical inventories makes highly complex and therefore highly useful language possible:

"We might imagine a system of communication in which a special cry would correspond to each given situations and these facts of experience, it will be clear that if such a system were to serve the same purpose as our languages, it would have to comprise so large a number of distinct signs that the memory of man would be incapable of storing it. A few thousand of such units as tête, mal, ai, la, freely combinable, enable us to communicate more things than could be done by millions of unarticulated cries." – André Martinet

Louis Hjelmslev's conception includes even more levels: phoneme, morpheme, lexeme, phrase, sentence and discourse. Building on the smallest meaningful and non-meaningful elements, glossemes, it is possible to generate an infinite number of productions:

"When we compare the inventories yielded at the various stages of the deduction, their size will usually turn out to decrease as the procedure goes on. If the text is unrestricted, i.e., capable of being prolonged through constant addition of further parts … it will be possible to register an unrestricted number of sentences." – Louis Hjelmslev

These notions are a continuation in a humanistic tradition which considers language as a human invention. A similar idea is found in Port-Royal Grammar:

"It remains for us to examine the spiritual element of speech ... this marvelous invention of composing from twenty-five or thirty sounds an infinite variety of words, which, although not having any resemblance in themselves to that which passes through our minds, nevertheless do not fail to reveal to others all of the secrets of the mind, and to make intelligible to others who cannot penetrate into the mind all that we conceive and all of the diverse movements of our souls." – Antoine Arnauld

Interaction of meaning and form

Another way to approach structural explanation is from Saussure's concept of semiology (semiotics). Language is considered as arising from the interaction of form and meaning. Saussure's concept of the bilateral sign (signifier – signified) entails that the conceptual system is distinct from physical reality. For example, the spoken sign 'cat' is an association between the combination of the sounds [k], [æ] and [t] and the concept of a cat, rather than with its referent (an actual cat). Each item in the conceptual inventory is associated with an expression; and these two levels define, organise and restrict each other.

Key concepts of the organisation of the phonemic versus the semantic system are those of opposition and distinctiveness. Each phoneme is distinct from other phonemes of the phonological system of a given language. The concepts of distinctiveness and markedness were successfully used by the Prague Linguistic Circle to explain the phonemic organisation of languages, laying a ground for modern phonology as the study of the sound systems of languages, also borrowing from Wilhelm von Humboldt.

Likewise, each concept is distinct from all others in the conceptual system, and is defined in opposition with other concepts. Louis Hjelmslev laid the foundation of structural semantics with his idea that the content-level of language has a structure analogous to the level of expression. Structural explanation in the sense of how language shapes our understanding of the world has been widely used by the post-structuralists.

Structural linguist Lucien Tesnière, who invented dependency grammar, considered the relationship between meaning and form as conflicting due to a mathematical difference in how syntactic and semantic structure is organised. He used his concept of antinomy between syntax and semantics to elucidate the concept of a language as a solution to the communication problem. From his perspective, the two-dimensional semantic dependency structure is necessarily forced into one-dimensional (linear) form. This causes the meaningful semantic arrangement to break into a largely arbitrary word ordering.

Recent perceptions of structuralism
Those working in the generativist tradition often regard structuralist approaches as outdated and superseded. For example, Mitchell Marcus writes that structural linguistics was "fundamentally inadequate to process the full range of natural language". Holland writes that Chomsky had "decisively refuted Saussure". Similar views have been expressed by Jan Koster, Mark Turner, and other advocates of sociobiology.

Others however stress the continuing importance of Saussure's thought and structuralist approaches. Gilbert Lazard has dismissed the Chomskyan approach as passé while applauding a return to Saussurean structuralism as the only course by which linguistics can become more scientific.  Matthews notes the existence of many "linguists who are structuralists by many of the definitions that have been proposed, but who would themselves vigorously deny that they are anything of the kind", suggesting a persistence of the structuralist paradigm.

Effect of structuralist linguistics upon other disciplines
In the 1950s Saussure's ideas were appropriated by several prominent figures in continental philosophy, anthropology, and from there were borrowed in literary theory, where they are used to interpret novels and other texts. However, several critics have charged that Saussure's ideas have been misunderstood or deliberately distorted by continental philosophers and literary theorists and are certainly not directly applicable to the textual level, which Saussure himself would have firmly placed within parole and so not amenable to his theoretical constructs.

Modern guidebooks of structural (formal and functional) analysis

 Roland Schäfer, 2016. Einführung in die grammatische Beschreibung des Deutschen (2nd ed.). Berlin: Language Science Press. 
 Emma Pavey, 2010. The Structure of Language: An Introduction to Grammatical Analysis. Cambridge University Press. 
 Kees Hengeveld & Lachlan MacKenzie, 2008. Functional Discourse Grammar: A Typologically-Based Theory of Language Structure. Oxford University Press. 
 M.A.K. Halliday, 2004. An Introduction to Functional Grammar. 3rd edition, revised by Christian Matthiessen. London: Hodder Arnold.

See also

 Theory of language

Notes

References

External links 
 Structural linguistics by Nasrullah Mambrol
 Key theories of Ferdinand de Saussure
 Key theories of Louis Hjelmslev
 Key theories of Emile Benveniste
 Key concepts of A. J. Greimas
 Institut Ferdinand de Saussure
 Revue Texto!
 Prague linguistic circle

Structuralism
Linguistic theories and hypotheses